Heritage Singers are an American gospel group founded by Max Mace and his wife Lucy, with their two children Valerie Ann and Gregory James. Based near Placerville, California, the group has traveled to over 65 countries, performed over 7,000 concerts, produced 200 television programs, and recorded over 200 albums.

History

After four years of performing with the Rose City Singers, a patriotic/folk singing group sponsored by Portland-based United Medical Laboratories, the Maces decided to resign and form a Christian group in 1971.  Jerry Leiske named the group based on Bible scripture equating saints with God's "heritage ... objects of His special care."

The first year, they released two albums (Hymns We Remember and Come Along with the Heritage Singers), and performed their first public concert on June 4, 1971. Early accompanists included Bob Silverman on piano and Pete McLeod and Jeff Wood on guitars. In 1974 the Heritage Singers collaborated with Ron Huff, who arranged their first albums with full orchestration.

Heritage Singers bought a touring bus (a former Greyhound PD-4501 Scenicruiser they named "Old Blue") from a lot in San Francisco, which remained in their service for 10 years.

As their popularity grew (along with the television series "Heritage Singers Presents"), they formed a second group in September 1974, dubbed Heritage II, (subsequently named New Creation) to perform mostly at cities located in the eastern half of the United States;, and a third group, Heritage Singers en Español, which tours South America singing Spanish versions of the group's signature songs. More than 250 people have performed as members of The Heritage Singers; however, the Mace family has remained at its core. As for the religious affiliation of its members, Max Mace has stated that while a majority of them are Seventh-day Adventists, that's not in itself a requirement. "They have to be a born-again Christian and receptive to the Adventist message."

In the mid-1980's, the group televised a program called "Keep on Singing" and was aired on Trinity Broadcasting Network. It was uploaded on YouTube some time later and was called "Heritage Singers Classics". Around the same time this program was aired, Heritage Singers began performing for Loma Linda University Church and have done so ever since. Until recently, since the COVID-19 Pandemic, they have not been invited back as a whole group, but individual members have been invited to sing at various services of theirs (mostly Tim Calhoun who currently lives in Loma Linda anyways). Max Mace's nephew, Doug Mace, is also Director of Middle School Ministries there. However, the whole group has made its return for the Max Mace memorial service and their 50th Anniversary concert and currently plan to continue the tradition.

In 1985, the group collaborated with Art Mapa, a sound producer, arranger, guitarist, and composer, and eventually married Val Mace (-Mapa). Soon after, Turning Point Studio was created, where Heritage Singers albums were recorded thereafter.

Reunions

Celebratory reunion concerts have been held in 1979 (Swing Auditorium), 1986 (Anaheim Convention Center), 2001 (Ontario Convention Center), and 2005 (Crystal Cathedral). A final 45th anniversary reunion was held at the Citizens Business Bank Arena on July 30, 2016, with 126 singers on stage.

Death of founder, Max Mace

Following a bout with cancer, Max Mace died at his home in Placerville, California on November 4, 2020, one day shy of his 83rd birthday. At his memorial service held by the Loma Linda University Church, Max's daughter, Val Mace-Mapa, and her family have vowed to continue the forward-thinking path that Max and Lucy began.

Discography

Studio albums

Live albums

Videos

Recent members 

Singers

Typically 7 to 10 singers perform at each concert, and the line-up varies depending on the location and availability.

 Denar Almonte
 Ted Atwood
 Dave Bell
 Rob Burkey
 Tim Calhoun
 Marcelo Constanzo
 Melody Davis
 Tim Davis
 Kevin Dumitru
 Garth Gabriel
 Cindy Haffner
 Lisa Jensen
 Shani Judd Diehl
 John Lomacang
 Adriane Mace
 Amber Mace
 Max Mace
 Val Mace Mapa
 Chloe Mallory
 Darrell Marshall
 Jaclyn Pruehs
 Shastin Rains
 Scott Reed
 Frank John Salas
 Becki Trueblood Craig
 Miguel Verazas

Band

The recording musicians vary on each CD, and the band usually does not perform at concerts except for special occasions.

 Gary Hemenway - keyboards
 Art Mapa – guitars
 Austin Mapa – drums
 Art Munar – keyboards
 Nino Ocampo – bass
 Dani Stromback – keyboards
 Joel Umali – keyboards

Technical
 Tim Davis – vocal arranger and producer
 Greg Mace – sound engineer
 Lucy Mace - tour manager, song arranger
 Art Mapa – music arranger, producer, programmer
Source:

References

External links
 
 Firsthand biography by Dan Shultz in 2009-2010
 Heritage Singers Classics programming schedule on LLBN
 Heritage Singers discography at AllMusic.com
 Heritage Singers discography at CrossRhythms.com
 Heritage Singers discography at Discogs.com

Musical groups established in 1971
Performers of contemporary worship music
Chapel Records artists
American gospel musical groups
1971 establishments in Oregon
American Seventh-day Adventists